Richard Fowler may refer to:
Richard A. Fowler (born 1987), radio show host, media personality, and political activist
Richard Fowler (cricketer) (1887–1970), English cricketer
Sir Richard Fowler (chancellor) (died 1477), English administrator, Chancellor of the Exchequer
Sir Richard Fowler, 2nd Baronet (1681–1731), English politician
Richard Fowler (physician) (1765–1863), English physician
Rick Fowler, musician
Richard Fowler (naturalist) (1948–2016), American veteran, naturalist, and jungle expedition guide

See also
Dick Fowler (disambiguation)
Rickie Fowler (born 1988), professional golfer